Kasım Yıldız (born 10 October 1980) is a former professional footballer who played as a midfielder.

Career 
Yıldız was born in Sorgun, Yozgat, Turkey.

He made his professional debut in Ligue 1 for FC Metz. He played in the 2005–06 UEFA Cup for Finnish club AC Allianssi. In 2006 he signed with Championnat de France amateur side CSO Amnéville.

In June 2011, Yıldız moved to Luxembourg joining FC Swift Hesperange.

In January 2015, having retired from professional football, he joined Division d'Honneur side Trémery.

Notes

1980 births
Living people
People from Sorgun, Yozgat
Sportspeople from Yozgat
Turkish footballers
Association football midfielders
Ligue 1 players
Veikkausliiga players
AC Allianssi players
FC Metz players
FC Martigues players
CSO Amnéville players
FC Swift Hesperange players
Turkish expatriate footballers
Turkish expatriate sportspeople in France
Expatriate footballers in France
Turkish expatriate sportspeople in Finland
Expatriate footballers in Finland
Turkish expatriate sportspeople in Luxembourg
Expatriate footballers in Luxembourg